Allysine is a derivative of lysine, used in the production of elastin and collagen. It is produced by the actions of the enzyme lysyl oxidase in the extracellular matrix and is essential in the crosslink formation that stabilizes collagen and elastin.

Clinical relevance 
Large quantities of elastin and collagen present in tissue may lead to metastasis: spread of disease. Fibrous tissue containing oxidized collagen may result in a condition known as fibrosis. The oxidation of lysine residues present in collagen creates the aldehyde, aminoadipic-δ-semialdehyde (allysine). Increased allysine concentration in tissues has been correlated to the presence of fibrosis. To qualify protein carbonyls in biological systems, most research studies use the dinitrophenylhydrazine (DNPH) process. The study of particular protein carbonyls, such as allysine, reveals more about specific redox processes and mechanisms at the molecular level. Allysine and its oxidation product, α- amino adipic acid (α-AA), have been discovered to also be diabetes risk indicators. To get a better understanding of this concept, human serum albumin was incubated for 32 hours at 37 degrees Celsius in the presence of FeCl3 (25 μM) and increasing glucose concentrations. Both allysine and α-AA levels were found to rise as glucose levels increased which lead to the depletion of tryptophan. Regarding the underlying functions of tryptophan and its metabolites, depletion of tryptophan and its metabolites may result in additional physiological problems such as coronary artery disease and neurological complications.

Allysine quantification 
Allysine can be reacted with sodium 2-naphthol-6-sulfonate to produce a fluorescent bis-naphtol allysine product. Allysine can then be quantified through use of high-performance liquid chromatography (HPLC). This method of detection was used to show that allysine has a 2.5 fold higher concentration in fibrotic vs. normal tissue.

See also 
 Saccharopine

References 

Amino acids
Aldehydes
Aldehydic acids